Raimundo José Correia (born 2 January 1950 in Iguatama), best known as Lola, is a former Brazilian association football player. He currently works as a university professor in Ribeirão Preto and as a talent scout.

He was selected for the Brazil national team for a friendly against Yugoslavia on 19 December 1968.

External links
 Lola at Galo Digital
 
 

Brazilian footballers
Brazil international footballers
Clube Atlético Mineiro players
1950 births
Living people
Association football midfielders